Zwochau is a village and a former municipality in the district (Landkreis) of North Saxony, in the administrative region (Direktionsbezirk) of Leipzig, in Saxony. Since 1 January 2013, it is part of the municipality Wiedemar.

Location 
The village lies approximately 30 km east of Halle (Saale), ca. 20 km northwest of Leipzig, and 10 km southwest of Delitzsch. The national autobahn no. 9 runs west of the corporate boundary and can be accessed via the Wiedemar entrance ramp (ca. 4 km). The community is marked with the vestiges of the defunct middle German Brown coal industry. Lakes are currently forming in the vast open pits of the former mines (the Werbeliner See, Grabschützer See, and Zwochauer See) as a part of the new "Saxon Sealand." The Leipzig/Halle Airport is immediately south of Zwochau in the Schkeuditz district.

History 
The existence of the village of Zwochau is first documented in a charter from 1158. Since 1 April 1936 the villages of Flemsdorf and Schladitz have been amalgamated with Zwochau.

Sights 
 The "Saxon Sealand" (Sächsisches Seenland)
 The Zwochau Church 
 The Zwochau Post Windmill (Neue Bockwindmühle)

External links 
 Gemeinde Zwochau

References 

Nordsachsen
Former municipalities in Saxony